Massachusetts Convention Fandom, Inc. (MCFI) is an American 501(c)(3) tax-exempt non-profit organization incorporated in 1974 as an administrative vehicle for proposing, promoting, and running World Science Fiction Conventions (Worldcons) and other special (non-ongoing) SF conventions in the New England area.

Although MCFI rents space in the Boston clubhouse of the New England Science Fiction Association (NESFA) for its annual meetings, purchased the "Noreascon" trademark from NESFA, and has overlapping membership with NESFA, the two groups are otherwise separate.

History
Several staffers of the then-recently concluded Noreascon I, the 29th World Science Fiction Convention, met during a July 1974 at a party in Boxboro, Massachusetts, and established MCFI to bid for a Boston Worldcon in 1980.

MCFI's founders needed a new administrative corporation for that purpose because Noreascon I has been run as a one-shot effort, and thus its sponsoring group, Boston in 71, had been dissolved after that event.

Worldcons
In 1980, WSFS voters having approved MCFI's bid, MCFI ran Noreascon Two, the 38th Worldcon.

In 1989, MCFI ran Noreascon Three, the 47th Worldcon.

In 1997, MCFI bid two possible sites in Orlando, Florida for the 2001 (59th) Worldcon, and lost to a bid for Philadelphia.

In 2004, MCFI ran Noreascon Four, the 62nd Worldcon.

Other conventions
MCFI has also run SMOFcon 3 in Lowell, MA, December 5–7, 1986, SMOFcon 15 in Boston, MA, December 5–7, 1997, Ditto 11 in Newport, RI, November 6–8, 1998, the 25th World Fantasy Convention in Providence, RI, November 4–7, 1999,  SMOFcon 25 in Boston, MA, December 7–9, 2007, SMOFcon 35 in Boston, MA, December 1–3, 2017, and COSTUME-con 37 in Danvers, MA, March 22–25, 2019.

In 2011, MCFI bid Boston for the 2013 North American Discworld Convention, and lost to Baltimore.

Outreach
The group has published convention materials in various media including digital.

MCFI's charitable and educational work includes supporting the SF Outreach book giveaway  at Wondercon in 2011.

See also 
 Science fiction fandom
 Science fiction convention
 World Science Fiction Society

References

External links 
MCFI official website
Noreascon
MCFI at GuideStar
2001 Announcement of MCFI's bid for the 2004 62nd Worldcon being selected

Science fiction organizations
Convention Fandom